Harry Lamme (8 October 1935 – 12 November 2019) was a Dutch water polo player. He competed in the men's tournament at the 1960 Summer Olympics.

References

External links
 

1935 births
2019 deaths
Dutch male water polo players
Olympic water polo players of the Netherlands
Water polo players at the 1960 Summer Olympics
People from Naarden
Sportspeople from North Holland
20th-century Dutch people